Adrian Grygiel (born May 8, 1983) is a Polish-born German professional ice hockey player. He is currently playing for Eispiraten Crimmitschau in the DEL2. He has previously played with Krefeld Pinguine, Thomas Sabo Ice Tigers, Grizzly Adams Wolfsburg and Augsburger Panther in the DEL.

References

External links

1983 births
Living people
Augsburger Panther players
ETC Crimmitschau players
German ice hockey right wingers
Krefeld Pinguine players
Thomas Sabo Ice Tigers players
Grizzlys Wolfsburg players